The Belfast Trojans are an American Football team formed in January 2006, and have competed in the IAFL since 2007 playing NCAA rules in full contact. The Belfast Trojans are the current national champions, after winning Shamrock Bowl XXXIII.

The team currently train and play their home matches at Belfast Harlequins Club located at Deramore Park. The Belfast Trojans are the only Irish team to have a dedicated American Football field at their facility.

History
Formed in 2006 by players disillusioned with the now defunct Belfast Bulls, the Trojans joined the IAFL in 2007

2007 season

Playing their games at Malone RFC the fledgling Trojans ended their rookie year in the IAFL with a 3–3–2 record.

2008 season

The Trojans second year would prove to be one of great success but success that came at a cost.

The Trojans started with back to back games against two of the powerhouses of Irish American Football, the Dublin Rebels & the UL Vikings. Defeats in these two fixtures saw the Belfast side going 0–2 at the start of the season. However, by game day three something had begun to click and the Trojans swept away all teams before them as they battled to their first Northern Division Title. The division win set up a semi-final playoff in Limerick where the Trojans could not find their feet against a dominating Vikings side who conquered the Trojans in a 52–8 victory.

Playoffs

2009 season

Devastated by the semi-final loss the Trojans ranks withered and the 2009 season would prove to be a struggle. The IAFL was restructured into a single league after the dissolution of the Belfast Bulls and the remaining Belfast side suffered too.  With the squad decimated and morale low the Trojans would slump to a 2–6 losing season, their worst since their formation.

2010 season

The Trojans fourth season saw the dark times continue. Again the squad was depleted and veteran players were ravaged by injury. The Trojans limped through 2009 ending with a 3–5 record, making it two successive losing seasons. The future looked uncertain for the Belfast side.

2011 season

A proactive recruitment drive bolstered the Trojans squad with not only their largest roster to date but one with real quality throughout. The dark days of 2010 gave way to brighter times as the Trojans recovered finishing the season 6–2, narrowly missing out on winning the Northern Division away from bitter rivals the Carrickfergus Knights. The playoffs would prove a bridge too far though with the Trojans losing a tight wildcard playoff to the Craigavon Cowboys.

Playoffs

2012 season

Buoyed by the progression in 2011 the Trojans again worked hard at recruiting, numbers again swelled and the Trojans could for the first time boast the largest playing squad in Ireland. Improvements to the playbook and to the work ethic on the training pitch saw the Trojans approach the season with confidence. The regular season could not have gone more to plan with the Trojans topping the Northern Division for the first time since 2008 going unbeaten along the way.

Shamrock Bowl Playoffs

The first team played a home semi-final against the 2011 Champions the Dublin Rebels proved to be a cagey affair in the first half, but the third quarter saw the Trojans really come into their own and set up a high scoring finale where the Belfast side came out 66–38 winners.

Shamrock Bowl XXVI

For the first time in the competition's history, two unbeaten teams contested the Shamrock Bowl. Both the Trojans and the UL VIkings had dominated their respective divisions and had won their semi-finals in high-scoring style. The showpiece game in Irish American Football would once again return to Tallaght Stadium. The bowl itself did not reflect the high-scoring natures of the two teams, but it was a hard, tough, smashmouth affair that the Trojans managed to edge in the first two-quarters before finally securing the 16–14 win with a field goal in the final two minutes.

DV8's League

For the first time in their history the Trojans had a squad so large that it became necessary to enter the IAFL's DV8's development league to ensure playing time for all their players. Typifying the resolve shown by the Belfast outfit in 2012 the Trojans DV8's went 4–0, blowing away the opposition and capping off a fine unbeaten season for the team in green.

2013 season

The Trojans added experience to their ranks in the off season after their first championship. In came Conor Leckey from the Carrickfergus Knights and Fu Faapito, Chris Bondi and Gary Carr from the Craigavon Cowboys all boasting experience of playing in the United States. In addition the Trojans brought in Veteran defensive lineman Marty Devlin from the Craigavon Cowboys, Callum Leckey from the Carrickfergus Knights along with Mohamed Ramadan who joined with BAFL experience. This experienced group coupled with the enthusiasm of an impressive rookie class saw the Trojans begin their title defence with their strongest squad ever.

The Trojans carried on into 2013 as they had done in 2012. Going unbeaten in the league once more. Indeed, the only opponent that the Trojans couldn't match on the way to their second consecutive Northern Division win was the Irish weather that saw all matches in March postponed to later in the year.

EFAF Atlantic Cup 2013

As Irish Champions the Belfast Trojans were entered into the European Federation of American Football's Atlantic Cup an annual competition contested by the smaller European federations, Ireland, Holland, Belgium & Luxembourg. The two-day tournament at Tallaght stadium was hosted as part of The Gathering event. With Luxembourg unable to send a representative Trinity College were added to the tournament that saw Belgian champions The Brussels Tigers and Dutch representatives Amersfoort Untouchables travel to Dublin for the weekend of 29–30 June. The Trojans would play the Untouchables in the first game of the Tournament, coming out on top in a physical encounter that saw two Trojans in need of Hospital treatment. In the end the Irish champs prevailed and with Trinity College narrowly seeing off the Brussels Tigers there would be an all Irish final on the last day of the tournament. In what proved to be another physical affair the Trojans defeated Trinity 26–0 to clinch their first ever European crown.

Shamrock Bowl Playoffs

With the European diversion out of the way the Trojans were straight back to domestic business. An injury hit Trojans side weary from the exertions of the Atlantic Cup travelled to Gardai RFC to face the UL Vikings in the semi-final playoff, A re-run of the final in 2012. It was a day for the defences as the game remained scoreless into the fourth quarter but as the clock ran down the Trojans found their scoring touch and sealed the win that would send them to their second Shamrock Bowl.

Shamrock Bowl XXVII

The Trojans contested Shamrock Bowl XXVII against the Dublin Rebels the seven times winners of the trophy and most decorated team in Irish American Football history. Playing once more at Tallaght Stadium in searing summer heat the Trojans swept the Rebels aside, winning convincingly 48–18 despite a late rally by the Rebels. The Trojans were back to back champions.

2014 season

The departure of Head Coach Drew Mikhael coupled with an inevitable sense of complacency within the Belfast Trojans saw them struggle to hit the high gears in the early stages of the season. Despite a resounding victory over the Craigavon Cowboys the signs were there that things were not running as smoothly. The 26-game unbeaten streak came to an abrupt end when Trinity College travelled to Belfast and inspired by their talismanic running back Rob McDowell put the Trojans to the sword in an 18–0 defeat. The Trojans did not hang their heads for long however, the decision was made to install Mark McGrath, an inspirational leader within the Trojans locker room, as interim head coach. The Trojans bounced back and went on to win their remaining three league matches, the standout being the 50–0 demolition of the Carrickfergus Knights at the 4th of July Friday Night Lights game.

Shamrock Bowl Playoffs

For the second consecutive year the Trojans would travel to Gardai RFC in Dublin to face the UL Vikings. In a typically dogged affair the Trojans struggled to establish their offensive play and were held in the game by the defence. Eventually the Trojans offence rallied and the Trojans knocked the Vikings out at the playoff stage once again to reach their third Shamrock Bowl in three years.

Shamrock Bowl XXVIII

The Trojans opposition in the Shamrock Bowl would be Trinity College Dublin the only team to have beaten them in the previous three years. The Trojans were classed as underdogs for the first time since 2012 due to Trinity's victory over the champions earlier in the season. Again it was a day for the Trojan defence to prove themselves to be the most dominant unit in Irish American Football as both offences failed to cope with the intense rain that forced a cessation of the game for thirty minutes during the first half. In keeping with the defensive battle that was being waged it was Trojan linebacker Connor Whitla who scored the only touchdown of the game picking off Dan Finnamore and running it in from 20 yards. The Trojans had completed the "Threepeat" and could now take their place at the top table of Irish American Football.

EFAF Atlantic Cup 2014

Due to concerns about the ability of the club the Belfast Trojans chose not to compete in the 2014 Atlantic Cup. The Dublin Rebels travelled to Belgium to represent Ireland with three Belfast Trojans players Neil Graham, Neil Montgomery & Stuart Leckey joining their squad for the tournament. Despite defeat to the eventual winners Brussels Tigers on the first day the Rebels rallied to clinch third place with Belfast Trojan Neil Graham being named player of the tournament.

2015 season

Delighted with the turn around in fortunes since the league defeat in 2014 the Trojans confirmed Mark McGrath as the permanent head coach. Within the Trojan camp the focus was placed on increasing competition both on the pitch and on the training field, with that in mind the Trojans secured a high-profile friendly match against the East Kilbride Pirates, one of the elite teams in BAFA. The Trojans made the trip to Glasgow on 11 April and held the Pirates close until the final minutes, narrowly missing the chance to level the game before the Pirates would go on to score a crucial touchdown after the two-minute warning to defeat the Trojans 24–14. All in all it was a successful exercise for the Trojans, they had proven that they could compete at the top levels of BAFA and having completed their first game outside Ireland it gave the organisation confidence for future trips to Europe.

Domestically the Trojans continued their dominance. Eight league fixtures yielded eight wins and a fourth consecutive SBC Northern Division crown.

Shamrock Bowl Playoffs

For the first time SBC teams were allowed to apply to host the semi-final double header and the Trojans were granted the right to host the event. On a rain sodden day in Belfast, watched by hundreds of spectators, the Trojans once again faced the UL Vikings and typically of contests between these two teams it was a close affair with the Trojans coming out narrowly on top, notably Trojans top scorer WR David Richardson was ejected from the game and was duly suspended for the next two top flight games. A fourth Shamrock Bowl appearance was secured.

Shamrock Bowl XXIX

With Trinity College defeating the Dublin Rebels in the other playoff Shamrock Bowl XXIX would be a repeat of the previous years bowl. Trinity were a constant threat but the Trojans would rally and go on to win the game 28–14. The Trojans became only the second team to win four consecutive Shamrock Bowls in the modern era.

IAFL2

For the first time, IAFA allowed SBC teams to enter a second team into their IAFL2 development division. IAFL2 is a league that is in place to allow fledgling teams the opportunity to find their feet before graduating to a higher level of competition. The decision to allow seconds teams to enter was taken to allow the larger teams to develop rookie talent whilst simultaneously providing a higher calibre of competition for the newer teams. The Trojans eagerly accepted the invitation to participate. From the start it was clear that the Trojans 2nds were a class above their opposition even with restrictive rules on the use of veteran players. The predominantly rookie team set the same standards as the SBC team sweeping all before them in emphatic fashion led in the main by the dual threats of Matt Armstrong and Jonathan Siri.

IAFL2 Bowl

The IAFL2 Bowl was played on the second of August 2015 at Navan RFC in a double header with the IAFL1 Bowl. The Trojans faced the South Kildare Soldiers for the third time in 2015 and came out triumphant in a 48–0 blow out.

GFLI Atlantic Cup 2015

Keen to avoid a repeat of the disappointment of withdrawal from the competition in 2014 the Trojans made participation in Europe a central part of their plans for 2015. Now under the banner of the GFLI the Atlantic Cup would take place in Groningen, Netherlands and once more feature teams from Holland, Belgium, Luxembourg and Ireland. The Trojans travelled to Groningen on Friday 25 September with a strong squad firmly with the intention of winning the competition. In the first game of the tournament the Belfast Trojans faced the 2014 Belgian Champions the Ghent Gators who boasted several international players amongst their ranks. A fair degree of rustiness was evident for both teams but eventually the Trojans found their feet and defeated the Gators 27–14. The second game of the day saw the hosts the Groningen Giants defeat the Luxembourg Steelers to win the right to play the Trojans in the final. On day two of the tournament the Ghent Gators defeated the Luxembourg Steelers to claim 3rd place and then all eyes turned to the final. The Trojans took to the field wearing their new away uniforms, a throwback to the white shirts of their early days, the two teams seemed evenly balanced in the early stages of the game but eventually the hosts began to struggle with the power running of the Trojans offence and the tenacity of the defence. The Trojans pulled away to a healthy lead and despite a late Giants fightback the Irish champions won the game and with it their second European trophy in three years.

Official Sponsors
The Belfast Trojans are sponsored by Budweiser NI and by The Botanic Inn, Belfast

References

External links
 Belfast Trojans official website
 Belfast Trojans on Facebook

Sports clubs in Belfast
American football teams in Northern Ireland
2006 establishments in Northern Ireland
American football teams established in 2006